Richard Palmer (13 September 1848 – 2 March 1939) was an English professional cricketer who played for Kent County Cricket Club between 1873 and 1883.

Palmer was born at Hadlow in Kent in 1848. In 1871 he was employed as a professional player at Fenner's a role he was recommended for by William Yardley, the Cambridge University captain.

Palmer made his first-class cricket debut for Kent in 1873. He played occasionally for the county between then and 1876 and made two further appearances in 1882 for the county side, making a total of 13 first-class appearances for the county side. He was described in his Wisden obituary as a "good batsman" who generally played as a wicket-keeper. He collected six wicket-keeping dismissals in a match against MCC during the 1875 Canterbury Cricket Week. Palmer went on to play for Staffordshire in five non-first-class matches in 1886.

Palmer died at Lower Halstow near Sittingbourne in 1939 aged 90.

Notes

References

External links

1848 births
1939 deaths
English cricketers
Kent cricketers
People from Tonbridge and Malling (district)